Ali Molina is a census designated place located in Pima County, Arizona, United States. It is also unofficially known as Magdalena. Ali Molina is located within the Tohono O'odham Indian Reservation.

Demographics

References

Census-designated places in Pima County, Arizona